In the differential geometry of surfaces, an asymptotic curve is a curve always tangent to an asymptotic direction of the surface (where they exist). It is sometimes called an asymptotic line, although it need not be a line.

Definitions
An asymptotic direction is one in which the normal curvature is zero. Which is to say: for a point on an asymptotic curve, take the plane which bears both the curve's tangent and the surface's normal at that point. The curve of intersection of the plane and the surface will have zero curvature at that point. Asymptotic directions can only occur when the Gaussian curvature is negative (or zero). There will be two asymptotic directions through every point with negative Gaussian curvature, bisected by the principal directions. If the surface is minimal, the asymptotic directions are orthogonal to one another.

Related notions
The direction of the asymptotic direction are the same as the asymptotes of the hyperbola of the Dupin indicatrix. 

A related notion is a curvature line, which is a curve always tangent to a principal direction.

References

 
 Lines of Curvature, Geodesic Torsion, Asymptotic Lines
 "Asymptotic line of a surface" at Encyclopédie des Formes Mathématiques Remarquables (in French)

Curves
Differential geometry of surfaces
Surfaces

ar:منحنى مقارب
cs:Asymptotická křivka